Gary J. Nabel is an American virologist and immunologist, and President and chief executive officer of ModeX Therapeutics in Natick, Massachusetts.

Family
Gary J. Nabel was born in Hartford, Connecticut and is married to Elizabeth Nabel. Their three children are all pursuing careers as physician-scientists.

Education
Nabel completed his undergraduate, M.D., and Ph.D. studies at Harvard University (1975, 1980, and 1982, respectively). He completed his dissertation research in the laboratory of immunologist Harvey Cantor and then worked as a postdoctoral fellow in the laboratory of David Baltimore at the Whitehead Institute, studying regulation of HIV gene expression by the recently discovered NF-κB, a host transcription factor.  He completed his Internal Medicine residency at Brigham and Women’s Hospital.

Career
Gary J. Nabel, M.D., Ph.D. is a virologist and immunologist working on immune therapies and vaccines for cancer and infectious diseases. His scientific career has focused on the intersection of virology, immunology, gene therapy and molecular biology. Researching the molecular genetics and structure of viral replication, his approach to structure-based vaccine design has helped to catalyze the development of vaccines for global health threats.

Nabel joined the faculty of the University of Michigan in 1987, where he led a research lab focused on infectious diseases and cancer immunotherapy. Nabel was an investigator of the Howard Hughes Medical Institute until 1999, working on transcriptional regulation of cell and viral gene expressions, as well as viral vectors in gene therapy. He was the Sewell Professor of Internal Medicine and Biological Chemistry.

In 1999, Nabel was recruited to build a vaccine research program for the country at the National Institutes of Health in Washington, DC. He served as the founding director of Vaccine Research Center at the National Institute of Allergy and Infectious Diseases, NIH and senior investigator with tenure at the National Institute of Allergy and Infectious Diseases. At NIH, Nabel pioneered a renaissance in vaccine development through structure-based rational vaccine design. Nabel provided overall direction and scientific leadership of the basic, clinical, and translational research activities and guided development of novel vaccine strategies. This vaccine work spanned basic science to clinical trials, including more than 100 clinical studies in the United States, Europe, and Africa, including SARS, Chikungunya, universal influenza vaccines and Ebola vaccines eventually tested in Africa.

Nabel moved to Sanofi in 2012, and as chief scientific officer and senior vice president, he oversaw the Breakthrough Lab, which developed the first trispecific antibodies now in development for HIV. He also provided oversight of the Sanofi global R&D research portfolio, helping to guide more than ten products a year into clinical efficacy trials and bringing numerous products to licensure.

Nabel is currently president and chief executive officer for ModeX Therapeutics in Natick, Massachusetts.

Biomedical Research
Over the course of his career, Nabel discovered the first effective vaccine candidates for Ebola, Chikungunya and encephalitis viruses through his approach to rational design using molecular virology, structure and immunology.  This work catalyzed a renaissance in the vaccine field and led to novel passive and active immune interventions for universal influenza, EBV, and AIDS. He is author of more than 450 scientific publications, and he holds 86 patents.

At the University of Michigan, Nabel’s basic research investigated gene transfer, basic mechanisms of HIV gene regulation and NF-κB transcriptional control.

As founding director of NIH’s Vaccine Research Center, Nabel pioneered a renaissance in vaccine development through his rational approach to vaccine design.  Understanding the molecular genetics and structure of viral replication, he discovered the first vaccine against Ebola, using gene-based immunization to completely protect against infection in non-human primates. This work provided the conceptual basis that served as a prototype for the VSV vaccine recently proven efficacious in humans. He developed the first Chikungunya virus vaccine effective in primates and advanced universal influenza vaccines of unprecedented breadth and potency. His rational approach to structure-based vaccine design led to elucidation of broadly protective human immune responses to HIV, leading to the discovery of broadly neutralizing antibodies to the highly conserved CD4 binding site of HIV with his colleagues from the VRC. Recently, he created an innovative antibody platform, trispecific Abs, that show unprecedented anti-HIV breadth and potency. These antibodies have advanced into human trials.

Recognizing the threat of Ebola virus decades ago, he applied molecular immunology and virology analysis to identify genes critical to Ebola replication and assembly. Importantly, he showed that gene-based prime-boost immunization stimulates potent cellular and humoral immune responses and discovered the first protective vaccine for highly lethal Ebola virus in non-human primates, defined its immune mechanism of protection, and guided its development and testing in Africa.  His work has stimulated international progress against emerging pathogens, having advanced novel SARS and pandemic influenza. vaccines into clinical trials in record time, while creating promising candidates for encephalitis viruses and EBV.

At NIH’s Vaccine Research Center, he also contributed seminal advances to vaccine science neutralizing antibodies against HIV, universal influenza, Ebola, Chikungunya, and Epstein-Barr virus. He led research on viral molecular biology, protein structure, and immunotherapy, which defined modes of immune escape and led to the discovery of the broadly neutralizing antibodies to the highly conserved CD4 binding site of HIV that are now in human efficacy trials in Africa.

At Sanofi, Nabel developed a novel antibody platform that can recognize three targets in a single protein, trispecific antibodies, now under evaluation for the treatment and prevention of AIDS and cancer.

Nabel has also worked on EBV vaccine development for nearly a decade, since first sponsoring a meeting at the NIH’s Vaccine Research Center with the participation of the National Institute of Allergy and Infectious Disease and the National Cancer Institute. In collaboration with Jeffrey Cohen and NIAID, Nabel worked to apply structure-based design to the development of EBV vaccines and generated promising candidates

Awards
Nabel’s honors include the Amgen Scientific Achievement Award from the American Society for Biochemistry and Molecular Biology, the Health and Human Services Secretary’s Award for Distinguished Service, and the Geoffrey Beene Foundation Builders of Science Award from Research!America. He received an honorary degree from the University of London, as well as the U.S. Army Medical Department’s Order of Military Medical Merit. 
Nabel is an elected fellow of the Association of American Physicians, the American Academy of the Arts and Sciences, and the American Association for the Advancement of Science. Nabel was elected to the American Society for Clinical Investigation in 1992 and the National Academy of Medicine in 1998.

Service
Nabel served as the Chair of Board of Directors for the Keystone Scientific Symposia from 2017 to 2019. He as a Council Delegate to the AAAS, Medical Sciences Section from 1997 to 2002, and served as the editor for the Journal of Virology from 1995 to 2005.

See also 
 Elizabeth Nabel
 Elias Zerhouni

References 
 
 
 
 Advisory board bio page for the EU-funded Advanced Immunization Technologies project

Notes

Selected publications 
See Google Scholar for citation information.
 
 
 
 

Howard Hughes Medical Investigators
Living people
Members of the National Academy of Medicine
Sanofi people
Year of birth missing (living people)
American virologists
Harvard University alumni
University of Michigan faculty
Harvard Medical School alumni
Fellows of the American Academy of Microbiology